John Wyndout or Wendout (fl. 1378–1386), of Tavistock, Devon, was an English politician.

Family
His wife was named Alice; they are thought to have had one daughter.

Career
He was a Member (MP) of the Parliament of England for Tavistock in 1378 and 1386.

References

Year of birth missing
Year of death missing
English MPs 1378
Members of the Parliament of England for Tavistock
English MPs 1386